Peck Yui "Shirley" Ng (born 24 November 1960) is a Singaporean sports shooter. She competed in the women's 10 metre air pistol event at the 2000 Summer Olympics.

References

External links
 

1960 births
Living people
Singaporean female sport shooters
Olympic shooters of Singapore
Shooters at the 2000 Summer Olympics
Place of birth missing (living people)
Shooters at the 1998 Asian Games
Asian Games competitors for Singapore